Ust-Aldansky District (Uus-Aldan uluuha) is an administrative and municipal district (raion, or ulus), one of the thirty-four in the Sakha Republic, Russia. It is located in the center of the republic and borders with Kobyaysky District in the north, Tomponsky District in the northeast, Tattinsky District in the east, Churapchinsky District in the southeast, Megino-Kangalassky District in the south, and with Namsky District in the west. Its administrative center is the rural locality (a selo) of Borogontsy. Population:  22,372 (2002 Census);  The population of Borogontsy accounts for 23.6% of the district's total population.

Geography
The landscape of the district is mostly flat. Its main rivers include the Lena and the Aldan. There are many lakes in the district, the largest of which are Lakes Myuryu, Oner, and Targyldzhyma.

History
The district was established on January 9, 1930.

Demographics
As of the 1989 Census, the ethnic composition was as follows:
Yakuts: 97.2%
Russians: 1.6%
Evens: 0.2%
Evenks: 0.2%
other ethnicities: 0.8%

Economy
The economy of the district is mostly based on agriculture.

Inhabited localities

Divisional source:

*Administrative centers are shown in bold

References

Notes

Sources

Districts of the Sakha Republic
States and territories established in 1930